David Palic is a retired American soccer player who played professionally in the Western Soccer Alliance and American Professional Soccer League.

High School
Palic graduated from La Salle High School where he played from 1982 - 1985. In 1985 he was awarded the California Interscholastic Federation (CIF) 1-A Division Player of the Year. While playing for the Lancers he won two CIF SS 1-A Championships in 1983 and 1984. Palic is a member of the La Salle HS Athletic Hall of Fame.

College
Palic graduated from Santa Clara University, playing on the men’s soccer team from 1985 to 1988.  He was a 1988 Second Team NCAA All American. He was an All West Coast Conference (WCC) selection in 1986 and 1988. He is 2nd on the all time SCU men's soccer career assist list, with 34 assists. He is 8th on the all time SCU men's soccer career points list, with 62 points (goals and assists). In 1989 he received the Victor Corsignlia Award, given annually to Santa Clara University's top senior male athlete. In 2001, Palic was inducted into the SCU Athletic Hall of Fame.  In 2017, Palic's #16 jersey received honorary recognition.

Professional
In 1987, Palic spent the collegiate off season with the San Jose Earthquakes of the Western Soccer Alliance.  In 1989, he turned professional with the San Francisco Bay Blackhawks.  He continued to play for the Blackhawks in 1990.  While playing for the San Jose Oaks in 1992 they won the 1992 U.S. Open Cup with Palic scoring the opening goal. The San Jose Oaks where the last amateur team to win the US Open Cup.

References

Living people
American soccer players
American Professional Soccer League players
San Jose Earthquakes (1974–1988) players
San Francisco Bay Blackhawks players
Santa Clara Broncos men's soccer players
Western Soccer Alliance players
Association football forwards
Association football midfielders
Year of birth missing (living people)